This is a list of all Asterix volumes, including the 39 official albums and various tie-ins.

All original French publishing dates and volume numbers are shown. Other translation publishing dates and volume numbering may differ.

Goscinny and Uderzo

Uderzo only
After the death of Goscinny, Uderzo continued the series by himself, writing his own stories on subjects such as feminism and aliens, with travels to India and Atlantis.

Jean-Yves Ferri and Didier Conrad
The series is no longer written by Albert Uderzo, but rather by Jean-Yves Ferri and illustrated by Didier Conrad – the first time the story creation has been shared between two people since Goscinny's death in 1977.

Format
The storyline in a volume is typically 44 pages long; the exceptions are Asterix and the Golden Sickle, which is 42 pages, Asterix and the Goths, which is 43 pages, Asterix Conquers Rome, which is 28 pages, Asterix and the Chariot Race, which is 45 pages; and Asterix and the Class Act and Asterix and Obelix's Birthday: The Golden Book, both of which are collections of short stories.

In addition 
In the mid-1980s a series of illustrated text stories appeared, with some original art, but mostly taken and modified from existing albums. These were 26 pages in a smaller format than the normal albums with large print. They are aimed at a younger audience and were not enthusiastically received; translation into other languages was spotty.
 1984 – Les Pirates (The Pirates)
 1985 – L'illustrissime Belcantus (The Illustrious Belacantus)
 1985 – L'abominable  (The Dreadful Horrifix)
 1985 – Jericocorix (The Jericocorix)
 1986 – La course de chars (The Great Chariot Race)
 1986 – Le feu de pommes (The Apple Cider)
 1986 – Marmaille et pagaille (Kids and Chaos)
 1986 – L'eau du ciel (Water from Heaven)

In 1989 a final illustrated story appeared. The story was by Goscinny (in 1965) with new, original art by Uderzo. It was 32 pages and appeared in the larger format used for the regular albums. It was the only one that was published in English:
 1989 – Comment Obelix est tombé dans la marmite du druide quand il était petit  (How Obelix Fell into the Magic Potion When he was a Little Boy)

Also in 1989–90 the first eight illustrated stories were reprinted in some locales as four books, each containing two of the original stories.
1999 – Le livre d' Asterix le Gaulois

In 2007, Editions Albert René published Astérix et ses Amis (Asterix and friends), a collection of short Asterix stories written and drawn by, and in the distinctive styles of, a number of cartoonists other than Uderzo.  The book was dedicated to Uderzo on the occasion of his 80th birthday and carries a foreword by Sylvie, his daughter.

Film adaptations 
Asterix films not based closely on a single book have had film books released in a format similar to the original albums, but with scenes from the films and a written story.
 1976 – The Twelve Tasks of Asterix (Les douze travaux d'Astérix)
 1985 – Asterix Versus Caesar (Astérix et la surprise de César)
 1989 – Operation Getafix (Astérix et le coup du menhir)
 1994 – Asterix Conquers America (Astérix et les indiens)
 2006 – Asterix and the Vikings (Astérix et les Vikings)

References

External links
 Asterix NZ: Take a look Inside– Information on all the 33 Asterix books

de:Asterix#Liste der Bände
el:Αστερίξ#Κατάλογος τευχών Αστερίξ

sv:Asterix#Seriealbum